Beast Legends is a science fiction mini-series produced by a Toronto and Leeds based independent film company called Yap Films, Inc. It was first shown on the Canadian History Channel in the summer of 2010 and was later aired on the US SyFy Channel, starting on September 9, 2010 and ending on October 14, 2010. The show followed a team of creative researchers and artists who explored the globe following stories of legendary and mythological beasts. As they investigate the history behind these tales, they study the ecology and biology of similar real-life creatures that may have inspired the stories, and conclude by bringing the beasts to life with computer generated effects and animation.

Cast
Steve Leonard – Adventurer/Veterinary Surgeon
Francis Manapul – Comic Book Artist
Kathryn Denning – Myth Expert/Anthropologist/Archeologist
Scott V. Edwards – Organismic and Evolutionary Biologist

Other
Mike Paixao – Computer Animator

Reception
The premiere episode on the Syfy channel generated mixed reviews. Common Sense Media says "Beast Legends is an entertaining blend of science and fantasy. By grounding their research in history, zoology, and natural science, the team provides a very believable launching pad for the evolution of a legend. Not only does it make their own fictional CGI creation seem possible, it also shines a light on the ancient cultures that spawned the original myths."

DreadCentral.com says; "If the cancellation of "MonsterQuest" has left you jonesing for a new monster-hunting show, then Syfy's "Beast Legends" ... might fill the void and give you the cryptozoologists finding nothing or inconclusive evidence fix that you're still craving."

Episodes

References

External links 
Beast Legends at Syfy
 at Beast Legends
Monster Tracker 

Syfy original programming
Cryptozoological television series
Paranormal reality television series
2010s American reality television series
2010 American television series debuts
2010 American television series endings